Marimatha nigrofimbria, the black-bordered lemon moth, is a moth of the family Noctuidae. The species was first described by Achille Guenée in 1852. It is found in North America east of the Rocky Mountains and in Arizona and California.

Adults are on wing from May to September in the northern part of the range and from March to November in the south.

The larvae feed on Digitaria ischaemum and Ipomoea sagittata.

Conservation 
This species is listed as "Critically Imperiled" in New York State  based on NY sitting at the Northern range limit.

References

External links 

"Black-bordered Lemon (Marimatha nigrofimbria)". Insect Identification. Retrieved October 7, 2020.

Noctuinae